The Baltic air-policing mission is a NATO air defence Quick Reaction Alert (QRA) in order to guard the airspace above the three Baltic countries of Estonia, Latvia and Lithuania.

Mission

Within the Alliance, preserving airspace integrity is conducted as a collective task jointly and collectively using fighter aircraft for air policing. Air policing is a purely defensive mission. Since the 1970s, NATO has established a comprehensive system of air surveillance and airspace management means, as well as Quick Reaction Alert (QRA) assets for intercepts (QRA(I)) provided by its member nations. By means of radar sites, remote data transmission, Control and Reporting Centres (CRCs) and Combined Air Operations Centres (CAOCs) the Alliance ensures constant surveillance and control of its assigned airspace 24 hours a day and 365 days a year. NATO exploits these facilities to react within seconds to air traffic incidents in the Allies’ airspace. This structure of weapon systems, control centres and procedures is referred to as the NATO Integrated Air Defence System (NATINADS). NATINADS has been and remains one cornerstone of Alliance solidarity and cohesion. The responsible Allied Air Headquarters are at Izmir, Turkey and Ramstein, Germany. The dividing line is the Alps. The Headquarters Allied Air Command Ramstein’s air area of responsibility is divided in two Air Policing Areas (APAs):
APA 1 is controlled by the CAOC Finderup, Denmark (deactivated in 2013);
APA 2 is controlled by the CAOC Uedem, Germany.

NATO members without their own Air Policing assets are assisted by other NATO members. Luxembourg is covered by interceptors from Belgium, Slovenia is covered by the Italian Air Force and Albania is covered by Italian and Greek aircraft.

Since March 2004, when the Baltic States joined NATO, the 24/7 task of policing the airspace of the Baltic States was conducted on a three-month rotation from Zokniai Air Base in Lithuania and, starting from 2014, at the Ämari Air Base in Harju County, Estonia. Starting with the Turkish deployment, rotations changed to a four-month basis. Usual deployments consist of four fighter aircraft with between 50 and 100 support personnel.

To ensure Air Policing performance is conducted in a safe and professional way, adequate training was and still is required, as NATO member nations deploy their assets to Šiauliai Air Base, Lithuania, on a rotational basis. To standardize training across nations, Headquarters Allied Air Command Ramstein introduced a series of training events formerly called Baltic Region Training Events, now referred to as Ramstein Alloy Home to capitalize on experienced aircrews deployed to Šiauliai and to offer superior training for Estonian, Latvian and Lithuanian air forces and control facilities. The three host nations contributed €2.2 million in 2011 to cover the deployment expenses and are supposed to contribute €3.5 million yearly by 2015. In 2012, the Alliance allocated €7 million for Šiauliai airfield modernisation from the Security Investment Programme.

Hungary performed the mission for the first time in 2015, also Italy carried out the mission in January–April 2015, with 14 members having participated in Baltic Air Policing so far.

In 2013, the Baltic patrol was called in when the Swedish Air Force was unable to respond to a simulated attack by Russian bombers against Stockholm.

During the 2014 Crimean crisis, the U.S. Air Force deployed six F-15C Eagle fighter jets from US-run Lakenheath air base in eastern England to the Lithuanian Air Force Base near Šiauliai. These aircraft will augment the present mission comprising four U.S. F-15C Eagle aircraft. The U.S. heightened its NATO presence to increase the strength of the Baltic Air Policing mission. Another two U.S. KC-135 aerial refuelling aircraft brought aircraft service personnel. In May 2014, NATO established its second air base in Estonia's Ämari near Tallinn, beginning with a Danish deployment.  Additionally in May 2014, Polish Air Force units at Malbork Air Base were reinforced by the French Air Force.

In January 2022, due to the massing of Russian military forces along its border with Ukraine; American and Danish fighter jets were deployed to the NATO Baltic Air Policing detachments in Estonia and Lithuania, respectively, to provide enhanced air policing (eAP) over the Baltic States.

According to a former staff of the National Defence University of Finland the Baltic air bases are untenable in a war scenario as they lack hardened aircraft shelters, which make them vulnerable to attack. Also, Russia operates long-range SAMs in Kaliningrad, Pskov and Leningrad Oblast, which might severely hamper or stop air operations from the area.

Deployments

Accidents
 30 August 2011 – A French Mirage collided with Lithuanian trainer jet L-39, which crashed into a marsh. Both pilots ejected.
 29 April 2013 – A Danish F-16 landed in Tallinn after it suffered a bird strike, which caused minor engine damage.
 9 October 2015 – A German Eurofighter's right external tank dropped "while taxiing to the start position" on the taxiway in Ämari airbase, Estonia. The necessary torque of the tightening bolts "was not present".
 8 August 2018 – A Spanish Eurofighter accidentally launched an AMRAAM missile without a target while on patrol over Estonia. The missile was not confirmed to have self-destructed as designed.

Gallery

See also
Icelandic Air Policing

References 

Three years of NATO Baltic Air Policing

External links

Ministry of National Defence Republic of Lithuania  NATO Air - policing mission
Estonian Ministry of Defence
Headquarters Allied Air Command Ramstein - NATO Air Policing
NATO AIRCOM Exercises

Command and control
NATO Air Policing
21st-century Royal Air Force deployments
Military projects of the Baltic states
Military of Lithuania
Military of Latvia
Military of Estonia